Phytochemical Analysis is a bimonthly peer-reviewed scientific journal established in 1991 and published by John Wiley & Sons.  It covers research on the utilization of analytical methodology in Plant Chemistry. The current editor-in-chief is Prof Satyajit Sarker (Liverpool John Moores University) and Managing Editor is Dr Lutfun Nahar (Liverpool John Moores University).

Abstracting and indexing
The journal is abstracted and indexed in:
 Chemical Abstracts Service
 Current Contents/Agriculture, Biology & Environmental Sciences
 Index Medicus/MEDLINE/PubMed
 Scopus
 Science Citation Index
According to the Journal Citation Reports, the journal has a 2020 impact factor of 3.373.

Notable papers
According to the Web of Science, the following articles have been cited over 200 times:

References

External links

Chemistry journals
Wiley (publisher) academic journals
Publications established in 1991
English-language journals
Bimonthly journals
Botany journals